The Battle of Yiwu (伊吾) is also called the Battle to Defend Yiwu (伊吾保卫战) by the Chinese Communist Party and resulted in the communist victory. After the local nationalist commanders in Xinjiang defected to the communist side, many nationalists loyal to Chiang Kai-shek refused to join the communists and one detachment of these loyal nationalists decided to take the town of Yiwu (Uyghur: Ara Türük) to turn it into a guerrilla base in order to fight on until the eventual return of Chiang.

The battle
The 2nd Company of the 46th Regiment of the communist 16th Division with less than 100 men were stationed at the town of Yiwu, 200 km northeast of Hami and over 700 nationalists under the nationalist Hami special envoy commissioner Yulbars Khan and the former nationalist county head Abdullah (艾拜都拉) of Hami planned to take the town in late March 1950. The nationalist attack on the town was launched according to schedule on March 29, 1950.

The nationalists were confident in that the town could be taken within a little as three days and on the first day of the battle, the nationalists had succeeded in taking the northern and southern peaks next to the town, thus seriously threatened the enemy defenders within the town. Realizing the serious situation, the enemy defenders sent out four squads to retake both peaks, and thus solidified the defense of the town, threatening the nationalists instead. The nationalist attempts to take the two peaks back was met with disastrous failure after several dozens assaults were beaten back with heavy losses. Realizing the tactic must be changed in order to avoid further casualties and the two hilltops must be taken, the nationalists adjusted their tactic of small scale assaults to launch a coordinated large scale attacks on April 5, 1950. After the five-hour-long battle that lasted from 3:00 AM to 8:00 AM, the nationalist again suffered defeat with great loss due to favorable terrain the enemy defenders enjoyed. It was the last large scale attack the nationalists were able to muster and the defeat cost the nationalists so much that nothing on the similar scale could be repeated again in the battle.

Due to the lack of communication and the closest communist force was more than 200 km away, it was not until early April 1950 did the closest enemy force learned that their comrades in the town of Yiwu (伊吾) was besieged and sent out a token reinforcement, which was successfully stopped by the nationalists more than a dozen kilometers away from the town. Due to the lack of intelligence, the commander of the enemy reinforcement mistakenly believed that the town had fallen into the nationalist hands when the entire garrison was wiped out, and withdrew to Micheng (沁城) on April 14, 1950. However, the enemy defending Yiwu (伊吾) was far from being wiped out, but instead, successfully beaten back seven nationalist assaults, badly mauling the attacking nationalist in the process by taking advantage of the favorable terrain.

In the beginning of May 1950, the communist 16th Division learned that the 2nd Company of the 46th Regiment still had the town firmly in its hands, and thus immediately sent out two battalions for reinforcement. By May 7, 1950, the enemy reinforcement had taken the Black Hilltop (Hei Shan Tou, 黑山头), and surrounded the nationalists who besieged the town. Sandwiched between the enemy defending the town and the enemy reinforcement surrounding them, the fates of the trapped nationalists were sealed. Realizing it was all over, the nationalists collapsed and attempted to flee despite the fact there was nowhere to escape. The enemy defenders easily linked up with their reinforcement and completely annihilated the nationalists on the same day, and not a single nationalist was able to escape. For its successful defense of the town, Peng Dehuai, the communist defense minister awarded the 2nd Company of the 46th Regiment of the communist 16th Division the title Steel and Iron 2nd Company, while the deputy battalion commander, Hu Qingshan (胡青山) was awarded the title Combat Hero.

Outcome
The nationalist defeat was primarily due to Chiang Kai-shek’s uncompromising doctrine of holding onto the land conquered at all costs, which was faithfully followed by the local nationalists, despite that it was simply impractical and impossible to hold on to the town. As it was becoming obviously clear that attacking nationalists were impossible to take the town, the nationalists refused to retreat, thus exhausting all of their available supplies. The lack of supplies, in turn, forced the nationalists to attempt to capture the town in order to capture more supplies, and thus the nationalists were locked in a dilemma they had created themselves, resulting in eventual total annihilation.

For the communists, there was a special recipient of third class honor: it was not a soldier, but a military horse named Jujube Colored Horse (枣骝马). During the battle, the supply line (especially for water) to the communists defending the northern peak 211 metres above the sea level was sealed off by the nationalist fire. A communist soldier named Wu Xiaoniu (吴小牛) of the 2nd Company was sent to take the horse to supply the isolated but crucial communist position. Once fired by the enemy, the soldier immediately lay down and took cover behind rocks, and amazingly, the horse did the same by following its master, the soldier. Due to the severe shortage of manpower, Wu Xiaoniu only performed the supply mission once and then was tasked with other duties, and the horse was instructed to perform the mission itself by Wu Xiaoniu first loading it up with supply, and then pointing toward the northern peak. Amazingly, during the forty-day battle, the horse completed every mission itself while dodging enemy fire. Due to its special contribution, not only it was awarded the third-class honor after the battle, it remained in the service until its natural death in November 1967, instead of being discharged when aged like all other military horses. The Jujube Colored Horse had a military burial at the foothill of the northern peak it helped to defend, and in August 1985, a marble monument was added to its tomb.

See also
List of battles of the Chinese Civil War
National Revolutionary Army
History of the People's Liberation Army
Chinese Civil War

References

Zhu, Zongzhen and Wang, Chaoguang, Liberation War History, 1st Edition, Social Scientific Literary Publishing House in Beijing, 2000,  (set)
Zhang, Ping, History of the Liberation War, 1st Edition, Chinese Youth Publishing House in Beijing, 1987,  (pbk.)
Jie, Lifu, Records of the Liberation War: The Decisive Battle of Two Kinds of Fates, 1st Edition, Hebei People's Publishing House in Shijiazhuang, 1990,  (set)
Literary and Historical Research Committee of the Anhui Committee of the Chinese People's Political Consultative Conference, Liberation War, 1st Edition, Anhui People's Publishing House in Hefei, 1987, 
Li, Zuomin, Heroic Division and Iron Horse: Records of the Liberation War, 1st Edition, Chinese Communist Party History Publishing House in Beijing, 2004, 
Wang, Xingsheng, and Zhang, Jingshan, Chinese Liberation War, 1st Edition, People's Liberation Army Literature and Art Publishing House in Beijing, 2001,  (set)
Huang, Youlan, History of the Chinese People's Liberation War, 1st Edition, Archives Publishing House in Beijing, 1992, 
Liu Wusheng, From Yan'an to Beijing: A Collection of Military Records and Research Publications of Important Campaigns in the Liberation War, 1st Edition, Central Literary Publishing House in Beijing, 1993, 
Tang, Yilu and Bi, Jianzhong, History of Chinese People's Liberation Army in Chinese Liberation War, 1st Edition, Military Scientific Publishing House in Beijing, 1993 – 1997,  (Volume 1), 7800219615 (Volume 2), 7800219631 (Volume 3), 7801370937 (Volume 4), and 7801370953 (Volume 5)

Conflicts in 1950
Yiwu
1950 in China
20th century in Xinjiang